Oliver "Oli" Ocol Lozano (May 13, 1940 – April 12, 2018) was a Filipino lawyer who was the legal counsel of the Philippine president Ferdinand Marcos. He was born in Ilocos Norte.

Education and career
Lozano graduated elementary and high school at Dingras Elementary and High School, respectively. He earned his Law and Bachelor of Arts degrees at the University of the Philippines.

As 40 year practicing lawyer, he was legal counsel for Philippine Consumers’ Foundation, Unification Movement, World Unification Church, Apostolic Catholic Church, Jesus is Lord Crusaders, The Lord Jesus Christ, The Great Commission World Ministry Inc., Active Civilian Force, Inc., Economic Recovery Action Program, Inc., Motherland International Foundation, Inc., National Organization of Women Agenda, Poverty, Inc., Muslim League of Welfare Development, Inc., Trade Union of the Philippines, Action Bayan, Inc. and Quezon City Federation of Women Civic Organizations.

Philippine general election, 2004 and 2007
Lozano was the first senatorial candidate to file his certificate of candidacy, under the Kilusang Bagong Lipunan, the ruling party during the Marcos regime. Lozano was later joined by radio announcer and KBL candidate Melchor Chavez. Both Lozano and Chavez lost in previous senatorial derbies. In the 2004 Philippine general election and  2007 Philippine general election, (Independent) Lozano landed on the 36th and 32nd place, with measly 238,272 and 305,637 votes, respectively.

Impeachment complaints
Lozano filed an impeachment complaint against President Gloria Macapagal Arroyo in June 2005 in connection with the President's supposedly wiretapped conversations with former COMELEC commissioner Virgilio Garcillano. He also filed the 2006, September 2007, February and August 2008 impeachment complaints.

The 2005 Lozano impeachment was defeated principally due to technical deficiency rather than on merit. All the other complaints were dismissed for insufficiency in substance. On October 13, 2008, Lozano, together with his daughter Evangeline Lozano and Elly Pamatong, attempted but failed to file their 4-pages mailed impeachment complaint against President Gloria Macapagal Arroyo, due to tardiness, since the opposition and civil society groups led by Jose de Venecia III, filed ahead of their own 97-page complaint. The House secretariat accepted the Lozano complaint at 10:02 a.m., while  the duly verified and endorsed De Venecia complaints, inter alia were received at 7:40 a.m.

Dispute over the KBL
There has been confusion recently in the 2007 election campaign within the party. This confusion stems from the recent endorsement (allegedly by the KBL) of Marcos loyalist lawyer Oliver Lozano to dubious senatorial candidate Joselito Pepito "Peter" Cayetano, who has the namesake of Rep. Alan Peter Cayetano, an opposition stalwart. Rep. Cayetano said that Gov. Bongbong Marcos, who is the president of the KBL, has certified that Joselito Cayetano has no party affiliation whatsoever with the KBL and that no endorsement was called for his namesake's candidacy. More recently, Marcos has denounced loyalist lawyer and senatorial candidate Oliver Lozano along with his candidates for turning the KBL into an "embarrassment". Marcos said that the party leadership will deal with the "renegade members" of the KBL after the elections. However, Lozano has repeatedly contended on television and radio that Marcos is an "honorary" president, and the real power within the party lies with Vicente Millora, who is the duly noted party chairman.

Quotes

On not being allowed to attend a COMELEC meeting:
“They locked me out from the meeting. They did not even give me that courtesy to inform me whether I was invited or not. They made me wait.” 

On his impeachment complaint when asked the reaction of Senator Francis Escudero
“He [Escudero] was silent. He did not give me the go signal to file it but implied the fact that he did not also stop me.” 

On the reaction of Opposition congressmen to his impeachment complaint
“I feel insulted. But in fighting for my principle, I should never involve my personal emotion so I contained my pride, held my anger and gracefully exited. Very impliedly, they [opposition] don't want to talk to me.”

Controversy
Criminal lawsuits Nos. 86-49007 and 86-49008 were filed against Lozano, Benjamin Nuega and Annie Ferrer as accomplices to the July 27, 1986 murder of Stephen Salcedo, a known "Coryista." On December 16, 1988, the trial court acquitted Lozano for failure of the prosecution to prove his guilt beyond reasonable doubt.

Death
On March 22, 2018, Lozano survived a heart attack after undergoing angioplasty. He was discharged from the hospital five days later after showing signs of recovery. However he was hospitalized at the Capitol Medical Center in Quezon City on April 11 due to weak pulse and general weakness. He died early morning of the following day.

Personal life
Lozano was married to Norma Junio.

External links
 Oliver Lozano's Profile

References

1940 births
2018 deaths
People from Ilocos Norte
Kilusang Bagong Lipunan politicians
Independent politicians in the Philippines
20th-century Filipino lawyers